Porta Matera was one of the main gates of the old city of Altamura. They were part of the City Walls of Altamura (dating back to Middle Ages and rebuilt in 1648), which were completely demolished during the nineteenth century since they had become useless for defence purposes. The gate itself was demolished in 1872. The monastery Monastero del Soccorso is located on the left side of the gate, while on the right some ruins of the city walls can be seen, presumably saved from destruction because of the bas-relief depicting "Pipino's leg" (relating to the killing and subsequent dismemberment of Giovanni Pipino di Altamura in the Middle Ages).

In the past, it was known as porta montium, which is Latin and it means "the gate that leads to the mountains" of Italian region Basilicata. Nowadays, the gate is known mostly because of the Altamuran Revolution (1799).

Pipino's leg 

Some ruins of the medieval city walls of Altamura (not to be confused with the Megalithic Walls of Altamura) are still visibile on the right side of Porta Matera. The ruins were not demolished probably because of the historical importance of the area: a leg of Giovanni Pipino di Altamura (1357) was exposed on that part of the city walls. Giovanni Pipino, because of his rebellious behavior, was hanged on the battlements of Altamura Castle and his body was later dismembered. His body parts were displayed inside the city as a warning to the population, and one of those was displayed on the left side of Porta Matera. In memory of this, a bas-relief ("Pipino's leg") was later made and placed on top of the walls; this bas-relief was then destroyed and rebuilt in 1648 during the restoration works of the city walls and it's still visible.

The Altamuran Revolution 

Porta Matera is known mainly for having been the gate through which the Sanfedisti, led by Cardinal Fabrizio Ruffo, penetrated into the city during the battle of the Altamuran Revolution (1799) (Neapolitan Republic of 1799). During this battle, many Altamurans and Sanfedisti were killed. Among those were Altamuran citizens Maurizio D'Alesio and Giuseppe Tubito, who were torn apart by a grenade explosion. Moreover, an old widow called "vedova Turco" was killed by Sanfedisti right after their entry into the city; her house was located close to Porta Matera and it was looted first by invaders. She was hit with sabers and closed into a lot that was then burnt; she was found after three days and healed by one of her relatives.

In the square in front of Porta Matera, Giovanni Firrao was also killed by Fabrizio Ruffo himself on the same day the Sanfedisti entered the city (10 May 1799).

References

Bibliography

See also 
 Porta Bari (Altamura)
 Altamura
 Altamuran Revolution

Altamura
Gates of Altamura